Paralacydes arborifera is a moth of the family Erebidae. It was described by Arthur Gardiner Butler in 1875. It is found in Angola, Botswana, the Democratic Republic of the Congo, Ethiopia, Kenya, Lesotho, Mozambique, Namibia, Somalia, South Africa, Sudan, Tanzania and Zimbabwe.

References

Spilosomina
Moths described in 1875
Moths of Sub-Saharan Africa